Wandoor is a town in Malappuram district of Kerala, India at . It is located 13 km away from Nilambur.

Localities
Wandoor Siva Temple

Notable people
 The renowned Mappila Paattu poet Pulikkottil Hyder was born here.
 T. K. Hamza, former minister of Kerala and former Member of Parliament.

References

Cities and towns in Malappuram district
Nilambur area